The New Tribe is a 2000  novel  written by Nigerian writer Buchi Emecheta. It was first published by Allison & Busby, and republished by Heinemann as part of the African Writers Series.

References 

2000 Nigerian novels
English-language novels
Novels by Buchi Emecheta